Thomas Hathaway (died 1424) was the member of the Parliament of England for Marlborough for the parliaments of April and November 1414.

References 

Year of birth unknown
1424 deaths
Members of Parliament for Marlborough
English MPs April 1414
English MPs November 1414